The British and Irish Association of Zoos and Aquariums (BIAZA) (formerly the Federation of Zoological Gardens of Great Britain and Ireland) is a registered charity and the professional body representing over 100 zoos and aquariums in Britain and Ireland.

BIAZA members must comply with BIAZA codes of practice, as well as undertaking significant work in the field of animal welfare, conservation, education and research.

Key objectives

Conservation 
BIAZA members support over 700 field conservation projects contributing over £11 million per year. Members supply skills, staff and equipment for wildlife conservation, and essential materials for education and awareness programmes in developing countries. They also play an important role in conservation awareness-raising in the UK, support conservation campaigns and facilitate career development of young conservationists.

Education 
More than 25 million people visit BIAZA collections every year including 1.3 million children on organised education trips. BIAZA encourages its members to develop an effective education system aiming to conserve the natural world in a number of ways by motivating people to change their habits, inspiring people to get involved with conservation and encouraging people to donate to particular conservation programmes.

Research 
Research in BIAZA zoos and aquariums aims to gather knowledge that benefits the conservation of threatened species. BIAZA collections assist over 800 research projects to raise awareness and increase knowledge about wildlife and global issues.

A significant number of zoo animals housed within the UK are part of European breeding programmes (EEPs) which aim to preserve threatened species for the future by pairing compatible individuals.

Awards 
An annual event is held at which awards are given out for a variety of achievements, known as the "Zoo Oscars". Awards categories include: Animal Breeding, Care and Welfare; Conservation; Education; Exhibits; Horticulture; PR, Marketing, Digital and Events; Research; Sustainability. There are also awards for individuals and collections that make outstanding contributions.

See also 
 World Association of Zoos and Aquariums
 European Association of Zoos and Aquaria
 List of Zoological Gardens and Aquariums in United Kingdom
 List of Zoos and Aquariums in Ireland
 List of zoo associations

References

External links
British and Irish Association of Zoos and Aquariums
BBC News: "Huge animal audit gets under way"

Organisations based in the City of Westminster
Organizations established in 1966
Zoos in the United Kingdom
Zoos in Ireland
Zoo associations
1966 establishments in Ireland
1966 establishments in the United Kingdom